Thor has been the name of at least two ships of the Swedish Navy:

, was a steam corvette launched in 1841 and decommissioned in 1887.
, was a coastal defence ship that was launched on 7 March 1898.

Swedish Navy ship names